Marvin Dwayne Minnis (born February 6, 1977), nicknamed "Snoop" Minnis, is a former American college and professional football player who was a wide receiver in the National Football League (NFL) and Canadian Football League (CFL) for four seasons.  He played college football for Florida State University, and earned All-American honors.  He was drafted by the Kansas City Chiefs in the third round of the 2001 NFL Draft, and also played professionally for the CFL's Toronto Argonauts.

Early years
Minnis was born in Miami, Florida.  He attended Miami Northwestern High School, and played high school football for the Northwestern Bulls.

College career
He attended Florida State University, where he played for coach Bobby Bowden's Florida State Seminoles football team from 1997 to 2000.  He led the Seminoles in receptions during his 2000 senior season, received first-team All-Atlantic Coast Conference (ACC) honors, and was recognized as a consensus first-team All-American.  He was among the Seminoles' offensive most valuable players, was a finalist for the Fred Biletnikoff Award, and remains tied for the FSU team record for the longest touchdown reception—98 yards against the Clemson Tigers in 2000. He was ruled academically ineligible for the 2000 National Championship against Oklahoma.

Professional career

Kansas City Chiefs
Minnis was drafted by the Kansas City Chiefs in the third round of the 2001 NFL Draft. He played 15 games for the Chiefs in 2001 and 2002, totaling 515 receiving yards on 34 receptions, including one touchdown.

Nickname
Minnis was given the nickname "Snoop" by his mother. "My mom, she said I was always snooping around. Like my son, he's a mess he's into everything," said Minnis. "My momma said I was always into everything, that's why she gave me that name."

Life after football
Following his retirement in 2005, Minnis joined Lexus as a salesman in Lexus of Pembroke Pines, and he was the Wide Receivers Coach at Everglades High School in Miramar.

See also
 List of NCAA major college football yearly receiving leaders

References

1977 births
Living people
All-American college football players
American football wide receivers
Florida State Seminoles football players
Kansas City Chiefs players
Miami Dolphins players
Players of American football from Miami
Miami Northwestern Senior High School alumni
Tampa Bay Buccaneers players
Toronto Argonauts players
Players of Canadian football from Miami